Jens Jørn Mortensen (born 23 February 1927) was a Danish weightlifter. He competed in the men's middle heavyweight event at the 1952 Summer Olympics.

References

External links
 

1927 births
Living people
Danish male weightlifters
Olympic weightlifters of Denmark
Weightlifters at the 1952 Summer Olympics
People from Skanderborg Municipality
Sportspeople from the Central Denmark Region